Tupadły is a village in the administrative district of Gmina Władysławowo, within Puck County, Pomeranian Voivodeship, in northern Poland. It is located within the historic region of Pomerania. Prior to January 1, 2015 it was a part of the town Władysławowo.

The village has a population of 439.

Tupadły was a royal village of the Polish Crown, administratively located in the Puck County in the Pomeranian Voivodeship.

Gallery

References

Villages in Puck County